He Chao (born 11 February 1992) is a Chinese diver. He is the 2014 Asian Games gold medal Champion in the 1m springboard and silver medal champion in 3 m springboard.

He is the younger brother of Chinese diver He Chong.

References

Chinese male divers
Living people
Asian Games medalists in diving
Divers at the 2014 Asian Games
World Aquatics Championships medalists in diving
1992 births
Divers at the 2016 Summer Olympics
Olympic divers of China
Asian Games gold medalists for China
Asian Games silver medalists for China
Medalists at the 2014 Asian Games
20th-century Chinese people
21st-century Chinese people